Srđan V. Tešin (Serbian Cyrillic: Срђан В. Тешин, born 1971) is a Serbian writer and journalist.

Biography
He was awarded the prestigious "Borislav Pekić" literary scholarship in 2004 and literary award DKV in 2010. His works have been translated into English, German, French, Czech, Albanian, Polish, Hungarian, Macedonian, and Slovenian. In addition, he is represented in many domestic and international literary anthologies.
 
Working and living in Kikinda, Serbia, he is also the editor of the online magazine Plastelin and literary magazine Severni bunker.

In 2017, he has signed the Declaration on the Common Language of the Croats, Serbs, Bosniaks and Montenegrins.

Tešin's novel "Mokrinske hronike" was shortlisted among six finalists for the 2021 NIN Award.

Bibliography

Novels
 Antologija najboljih naslova (2000)
 Kazimir i drugi naslovi (2003)
 Kroz pustinju i prašinu (2005)
 Kuvarove kletve i druge gadosti (2006)
 Gori gori gori (2017)
 Moje (2019)
 Mokrinske hronike (2021)

Short story collections
 Sjajan naslov za pantomimu (1997)
 Priča za kraj veka (2000)
 Ispod crte (2010)
 Bunker (2013)
 Kuća na Ravnom Bregu (with Gojko Božović, 2013)
 Priče s Marsa (2015)

Children's prose
 Luka kaže (2020)

Other prose
 Alternativni vodič kroz Vavilon (2008) - collection of essays, columns and articles

References

External links
 Arhipelag
 Književna radionica Rašić
 Plastelin Online Literary Magazine

Serbian journalists
Serbian novelists
Serbian writers
Signatories of the Declaration on the Common Language
Living people
1971 births